Jeanne Pruett is a studio album by American country music artist Jeanne Pruett. It was released in October 1985 on Dot and MCA Records in October 1985. The project was produced by Billy Strange. The studio album marked Pruett's first full-length studio release in six years. It contained ten tracks, most of which were songs she had not yet recorded.

Background, content and release
In 1985, MCA Records relaunched the dormant Dot label. As part of the company's promotion, several veteran country artists recorded new studio albums to market towards the genre's older demographic. Among the other artists chosen for the project were Asleep at the Wheel, Jan Howard, Justin Tubb, Carl Perkins and Billie Jo Spears. In the album's liner notes, Pruett commented that she was excited to be given the opportunity. She was also excited about the new musical sound crafted by her producer, Billy Strange. Pruett and Strange recorded the project at the Chelsea Studio in Nashville, Tennessee in 1985.

The album was a collection of ten tracks. It included re-recordings of Pruett's two major hits in the 1970s: "Satin Sheets" (1973) and "Back to Back" (1979). Among the album's new tracks was a cover of Randy Travis's major hit "I Told You So". The final track on the record, "Rented Room", was written entirely by Pruett.

Jeanne Pruett was released in October 1985 in conjunction with Dot and MCA records. In its original release, the album was issued as a vinyl record, containing five songs on each side of the LP. In 1995, it was reissued as an audio cassette. No singles were originally released from the album. Instead, artists were expected to sell their new releases at their concerts and tours. However, in 1987, "Rented Room" would be released as a single and would peak at number 81 on the Billboard Hot Country Songs chart. It was Pruett's final chart appearance as a recording artist.

Track listing

Personnel
All credits are adapted from the liner notes of Jeanne Pruett.

Musical personnel
 Jimmy Capps – musician
 Ralph Childs – musician
 Mary Felder – background vocals
 Jerry Knoon – musician
 Terry McMillan – musician
 Kim Morrison – background vocals
 Jeanne Pruett – lead vocals
 Curtis Young – background vocals

Technical personnel
 Chuck Haines – engineering
 Billy Strange – producer

Release history

References

1985 albums
Albums produced by Billy Strange
Jeanne Pruett albums
Dot Records albums
MCA Records albums